Kalach Khandan (also Romanized as Kalāch Khandān; also known as Kalāj Khandān and Nūr Deh) is a village in Jirdeh Rural District, in the Central District of Shaft County, Gilan Province, Iran. At the 2006 census, its population was 163, in 46 families.

References 

Populated places in Shaft County